The 1886 Wisconsin gubernatorial election was held on November 2, 1886.

Republican nominee Jeremiah McLain Rusk defeated Democratic nominee Gilbert M. Woodward, Populist nominee John Cochrane, and Prohibition nominee John Myers Olin with 46.53% of the vote.

General election

Candidates
Major party candidates
Gilbert M. Woodward, Democratic, attorney, former member of the United States House of Representatives
Jeremiah McLain Rusk, Republican, incumbent Governor

Other candidates
John Myers Olin, Prohibition, lecturer in law at the University of Wisconsin, Prohibition nominee for Wisconsin's 3rd congressional district in 1884
John Cochrane, Populist

Results

References

Bibliography
 
 
 

1886
Wisconsin
Gubernatorial